is a passenger railway station located in the city of Akishima, Tokyo, Japan, operated by East Japan Railway Company (JR East).

Lines 
Nakagami Station is served by the Ōme Line, and is located 3.6 kilometers from the starting point of the line at Tachikawa Station.

Station layout 
This station consists of two opposed  side platforms serving two tracks,  connected to the station building by a footbridge.The station is staffed.

Platforms

History
The station opened on 18 July 1908 as a station on the Ōme Electric Railway. The line was nationalized on 1 April 1944. With the privatization of Japanese National Railways (JNR) on 1 April 1987, the station came under the control of JR East.

Passenger statistics
In fiscal 2019, the station was used by an average of 11,447 passengers daily (boarding passengers only).

The passenger figures for previous years are as shown below.

Surrounding area
 Nakagami Station Shopping District

See also
 List of railway stations in Japan

References

External links

JR East - Station Information 

Railway stations in Tokyo
Railway stations in Japan opened in 1908
Akishima, Tokyo
Ōme Line